Old Scandinavian may refer to:

 Proto-Norse, a language spoken from the 3rd to the 7th century
 Old Norse, a language spoken in Scandinavia from the 9th to the 13th century

See also 
 Scandinavian (disambiguation)